Deudorix renidens is a butterfly in the family Lycaenidae. It is found on Madagascar.

References

Butterflies described in 1884
Deudorigini
Butterflies of Africa
Taxa named by Paul Mabille
Deudorix